Cyprus or Cypriot Sign Language is an incipient sign language of Cyprus. It appears to be a pidgin of American Sign Language and Greek Sign Language, not yet a fully developed language. The Greek Cypriot deaf community predominantly uses the Greek Sign Language.

References

Sign language isolates
Pidgins and creoles
Languages of Cyprus